GT 64: Championship Edition, known as  in Japan, is a racing video game developed by Imagineer and released for the Nintendo 64 console in 1998. It is an official licensed game to All-Japan GT Championship, featuring cars and drivers of the 1997 All Japan Grand Touring Car Championship.

Gameplay
GT 64 is a racing game that features a ranking system comparable to Gran Turismo. Unlike the original version, which features tracks set in the US and Europe, the Japanese version features two new tracks set in Japan. The game supports the Rumble Pak.

Development
GT 64 was developed by Imagineer.

Reception

GT 64 received generally unfavorable reviews from critics, who criticized the game's limited number of tracks. N64 Magazine noted that, while the game had been touted as having 12 tracks, it actually only has three, without considering the mirror variants and the fact that each track offers both a short and a long route. The magazine concluded that GT 64 is inferior to Gran Turismo or GTI Club, but still more enjoyable than Automobili Lamborghini. Nintendo Power highlighted the game's energetic music and sound effects. Next Generation gave the game negative review, calling it as neither arcade nor simulation game. In Japan, Famitsu gave it a score of 23 out of 40.

See also
 World Driver Championship

References

External links
 

1998 video games
Imagineer games
Nintendo 64 games
Ocean Software games
Racing video games
Nintendo 64-only games
Video games developed in Japan